The following species in the flowering plant genus Aristolochia, the birthworts, pipevines, or Dutchman's pipes, are accepted by Plants of the World Online. Attempts to untangle taxonomic relationships within this taxon have met with difficulties.

Aristolochia acontophylla 
Aristolochia acuminata 
Aristolochia acutifolia 
Aristolochia adalica 
Aristolochia adiastola 
Aristolochia albertiana 
Aristolochia albida 
Aristolochia albopilosa 
Aristolochia alexandriana 
Aristolochia altanii 
Aristolochia amara 
Aristolochia andina 
Aristolochia anguicida 
Aristolochia angustifolia 
Aristolochia annamensis 
Aristolochia apoloensis 
Aristolochia arborea 
Aristolochia arborescens 
Aristolochia arcuata 
Aristolochia arenicola 
Aristolochia argentina 
Aristolochia asclepiadifolia 
Aristolochia asperifolia 
Aristolochia assamica 
Aristolochia assisii 
Aristolochia atropurpurea 
Aristolochia auricularia 
Aristolochia australopithecurus 
Aristolochia austrochinensis 
Aristolochia austroszechuanica 
Aristolochia austroyunnanensis 
Aristolochia baenzigeri 
Aristolochia baetica 
Aristolochia bahiensis 
Aristolochia balansae 
Aristolochia bambusifolia 
Aristolochia baracoensis 
Aristolochia barbourii 
Aristolochia baseri 
Aristolochia batucensis 
Aristolochia biakensis 
Aristolochia bianorii 
Aristolochia bicolor 
Aristolochia bidoupensis 
Aristolochia bilabiata 
Aristolochia billardieri 
Aristolochia bilobata 
Aristolochia binhthuanensis 
Aristolochia birostris 
Aristolochia bodamae 
Aristolochia boliviensis 
Aristolochia bonettiana 
Aristolochia boosii 
Aristolochia bottae 
Aristolochia bracteolata 
Aristolochia bracteosa 
Aristolochia brevifolia 
Aristolochia brevilabris 
Aristolochia brevipes 
Aristolochia bridgesii 
Aristolochia buchtienii 
Aristolochia bukuti 
Aristolochia bullata 
Aristolochia buntingii 
Aristolochia burchellii 
Aristolochia burelae 
Aristolochia burkartii 
Aristolochia cabrerae 
Aristolochia californica 
Aristolochia cambodiana 
Aristolochia cardiantha 
Aristolochia carterae 
Aristolochia castellanosii 
Aristolochia cathcartii 
Aristolochia caudata 
Aristolochia caulialata 
Aristolochia cauliflora 
Aristolochia ceresensis 
Aristolochia ceropegioides 
Aristolochia chachapoyensis 
Aristolochia chalmersii 
Aristolochia chamissonis 
Aristolochia championii 
Aristolochia chilensis 
Aristolochia chiquitensis 
Aristolochia chlamydophylla 
Aristolochia chrismuelleriana 
Aristolochia chrysochlora 
Aristolochia cilicica 
Aristolochia clavidenia 
Aristolochia clematitis 
Aristolochia clementis 
Aristolochia clusii 
Aristolochia coadunata 
Aristolochia cochinchinensis 
Aristolochia colimensis 
Aristolochia colombiana 
Aristolochia colossifolia 
Aristolochia compressicaulis 
Aristolochia consimilis 
Aristolochia constricta 
Aristolochia contorta 
Aristolochia conversiae 
Aristolochia cordiflora 
Aristolochia cordigera 
Aristolochia cornuta 
Aristolochia cortinata 
Aristolochia coryi 
Aristolochia crassinervia 
Aristolochia cremersii 
Aristolochia cretica 
Aristolochia cucurbitifolia 
Aristolochia cucurbitoides 
Aristolochia curtisii 
Aristolochia curviflora 
Aristolochia cymbifera 
Aristolochia cynanchifolia 
Aristolochia dabieshanensis 
Aristolochia daemoninoxia 
Aristolochia dalyi 
Aristolochia davilae 
Aristolochia debilis 
Aristolochia decandra 
Aristolochia delavayi 
Aristolochia deltantha 
Aristolochia deltoidea 
Aristolochia dictyophlebia 
Aristolochia didyma 
Aristolochia dielsiana 
Aristolochia dilatata 
Aristolochia dinghoui 
Aristolochia disticha 
Aristolochia × domingensis 
Aristolochia durangensis 
Aristolochia echinata 
Aristolochia ehrenbergiana 
Aristolochia ekmanii 
Aristolochia embergeri 
Aristolochia emiliae 
Aristolochia engleriana 
Aristolochia erecta 
Aristolochia eriantha 
Aristolochia esperanzae 
Aristolochia fangchi 
Aristolochia faucimaculata 
Aristolochia faviogonzalezii 
Aristolochia feddei 
Aristolochia filipendulina 
Aristolochia fimbriata 
Aristolochia flava 
Aristolochia flexuosa 
Aristolochia floribunda 
Aristolochia foetida 
Aristolochia fontanesii 
Aristolochia fordiana 
Aristolochia forrestiana 
Aristolochia fosteri 
Aristolochia foveolata 
Aristolochia fragrantissima 
Aristolochia fujianensis 
Aristolochia fulvicoma 
Aristolochia gabonensis 
Aristolochia gardneri 
Aristolochia gaudichaudii 
Aristolochia gehrtii 
Aristolochia geniculata 
Aristolochia gentilis 
Aristolochia gibertii 
Aristolochia gigantea 
Aristolochia ginzbergeri 
Aristolochia glaberrima 
Aristolochia glandulosa 
Aristolochia glaucifolia 
Aristolochia glossa 
Aristolochia goldieana 
Aristolochia goliathiana 
Aristolochia gongchengensis 
Aristolochia gorgona 
Aristolochia goudotii 
Aristolochia gracilifolia 
Aristolochia gracilipedunculata 
Aristolochia gracilis 
Aristolochia grandiflora 
Aristolochia grandis 
Aristolochia griffithii 
Aristolochia guadalajarana 
Aristolochia × gueneri 
Aristolochia guentheri 
Aristolochia guianensis 
Aristolochia guichardii 
Aristolochia gurinderi 
Aristolochia × gypsicola 
Aristolochia hainanensis 
Aristolochia haitiensis 
Aristolochia hansenii 
Aristolochia harmandiana 
Aristolochia helix 
Aristolochia heppii 
Aristolochia heterophylla 
Aristolochia hians 
Aristolochia hilariana 
Aristolochia hirta 
Aristolochia hispida 
Aristolochia hockii 
Aristolochia hoehneana 
Aristolochia hohuanensis 
Aristolochia holostylis 
Aristolochia holtzei 
Aristolochia howii 
Aristolochia huanjiangensis 
Aristolochia huberiana 
Aristolochia huebneriana 
Aristolochia humilis 
Aristolochia hyperxantha 
Aristolochia hypoglauca 
Aristolochia hyrcana 
Aristolochia iberica 
Aristolochia impressinervis 
Aristolochia impudica 
Aristolochia incisa 
Aristolochia incisiloba 
Aristolochia indica 
Aristolochia inflata 
Aristolochia insolita 
Aristolochia involuta 
Aristolochia iquitensis 
Aristolochia islandica 
Aristolochia jackii 
Aristolochia jianfenglingensis 
Aristolochia jingiangensis 
Aristolochia kaempferi 
Aristolochia karwinskii 
Aristolochia kechangensis 
Aristolochia kepara 
Aristolochia keratuma 
Aristolochia killipiana 
Aristolochia klossii 
Aristolochia klugii 
Aristolochia kongkandae 
Aristolochia krausei 
Aristolochia krisagathra 
Aristolochia krukoffii 
Aristolochia kunmingensis 
Aristolochia kwangsiensis 
Aristolochia labiata 
Aristolochia lagesiana 
Aristolochia laheyana 
Aristolochia lanceolatolorata 
Aristolochia lassa 
Aristolochia lauterbachiana 
Aristolochia ledongensis 
Aristolochia leonensis 
Aristolochia leprieurii 
Aristolochia leptosticta 
Aristolochia leuconeura 
Aristolochia leytensis 
Aristolochia liangshanensis 
Aristolochia limai 
Aristolochia lindeniana 
Aristolochia lindneri 
Aristolochia linearifolia 
Aristolochia lingua 
Aristolochia lingulata 
Aristolochia linnemannii 
Aristolochia littoralis 
Aristolochia liukiuensis 
Aristolochia longgangensis 
Aristolochia longiflora 
Aristolochia longispathulata 
Aristolochia longlinensis 
Aristolochia lorenae 
Aristolochia lozaniana 
Aristolochia lutea 
Aristolochia lutescens 
Aristolochia luzmariana 
Aristolochia lycica 
Aristolochia macedonica 
Aristolochia macgregorii 
Aristolochia macrocarpa 
Aristolochia macrophylla 
Aristolochia macroura 
Aristolochia malacophylla 
Aristolochia malmeana 
Aristolochia manantlanensis 
Aristolochia manaosensis 
Aristolochia mannii 
Aristolochia manokwariensis 
Aristolochia manshuriensis 
Aristolochia maranonensis 
Aristolochia marianensis 
Aristolochia marioniana 
Aristolochia mathewsii 
Aristolochia maurorum 
Aristolochia maxima 
Aristolochia medicinalis 
Aristolochia meionantha 
Aristolochia melanocephala 
Aristolochia melanoglossa 
Aristolochia melastoma 
Aristolochia melgueiroi 
Aristolochia meridionaliana 
Aristolochia meridionalis 
Aristolochia merxmuelleri 
Aristolochia micrantha 
Aristolochia microphylla 
Aristolochia microstoma 
Aristolochia minutiflora 
Aristolochia mishuyacensis 
Aristolochia mollis 
Aristolochia mollissima 
Aristolochia momandul 
Aristolochia montana 
Aristolochia monticola 
Aristolochia morae 
Aristolochia mossii 
Aristolochia moupinensis 
Aristolochia mulunensis 
Aristolochia mutabilis 
Aristolochia mycteria 
Aristolochia nahua 
Aristolochia nakaoi 
Aristolochia nana 
Aristolochia nardiana 
Aristolochia nauseifolia 
Aristolochia navicularis 
Aristolochia naviculilimba 
Aristolochia neinhuisii 
Aristolochia nelsonii 
Aristolochia neolongifolia 
Aristolochia nevesarmondiana 
Aristolochia novoguineensis 
Aristolochia nuichuaensis 
Aristolochia nummulariifolia 
Aristolochia oaxacana 
Aristolochia obliqua 
Aristolochia oblongata 
Aristolochia occidentalis 
Aristolochia odora 
Aristolochia odoratissima 
Aristolochia olivieri 
Aristolochia ophioides 
Aristolochia oranensis 
Aristolochia orbicularis 
Aristolochia ornithopterae 
Aristolochia ovalifolia 
Aristolochia ovatifolia 
Aristolochia pacayacensis 
Aristolochia pacifica 
Aristolochia paecilantha 
Aristolochia pallida 
Aristolochia palmeri 
Aristolochia panamensis 
Aristolochia pannosoides 
Aristolochia papillaris 
Aristolochia papillifolia 
Aristolochia paracleta 
Aristolochia paradisiana 
Aristolochia paramaribensis 
Aristolochia parvifolia 
Aristolochia passiflorifolia 
Aristolochia paucinervis 
Aristolochia paulistana 
Aristolochia peltata 
Aristolochia peltatodeltoidea 
Aristolochia peninsularis 
Aristolochia peninsulensis 
Aristolochia pentandra 
Aristolochia perangustifolia 
Aristolochia peruviana 
Aristolochia petelotii 
Aristolochia petenensis 
Aristolochia pfeiferi 
Aristolochia phetchaburiensis 
Aristolochia philippinensis 
Aristolochia phuphathanaphongiana 
Aristolochia physodes 
Aristolochia pichinchensis 
Aristolochia pierrei 
Aristolochia pilosa 
Aristolochia pilosistyla 
Aristolochia pistolochia 
Aristolochia pithecurus 
Aristolochia platanifolia 
Aristolochia pohliana 
Aristolochia poluninii 
Aristolochia polymorpha 
Aristolochia pontica 
Aristolochia poomae 
Aristolochia pothieri 
Aristolochia praevenosa 
Aristolochia preussii 
Aristolochia pringlei 
Aristolochia promissa 
Aristolochia prostrata 
Aristolochia pseudocaulialata 
Aristolochia pseudotriangularis 
Aristolochia pseudoutriformis 
Aristolochia pubera 
Aristolochia pubescens 
Aristolochia pueblana 
Aristolochia punctata 
Aristolochia punjabensis 
Aristolochia purhepecha 
Aristolochia purpusii 
Aristolochia putumayensis 
Aristolochia quangbinhensis 
Aristolochia quercetorum 
Aristolochia raja 
Aristolochia repanda 
Aristolochia reticulata 
Aristolochia rhizantha 
Aristolochia ridicula 
Aristolochia rigida 
Aristolochia ringens 
Aristolochia robertii 
Aristolochia rostrata 
Aristolochia rotunda 
Aristolochia rugosa 
Aristolochia ruiziana 
Aristolochia rumicifolia 
Aristolochia rumphii 
Aristolochia rzedowskiana 
Aristolochia saccata 
Aristolochia salweenensis 
Aristolochia samanensis 
Aristolochia samarensis 
Aristolochia savannoidea 
Aristolochia schippii 
Aristolochia schlechteri 
Aristolochia schmidtiana 
Aristolochia schottii 
Aristolochia schreiteri 
Aristolochia schultzeana 
Aristolochia schulzii 
Aristolochia schunkeana 
Aristolochia scytophylla 
Aristolochia secunda 
Aristolochia sempervirens 
Aristolochia sepicola 
Aristolochia sepikensis 
Aristolochia sericea 
Aristolochia serpentaria 
Aristolochia sessilifolia 
Aristolochia setosa 
Aristolochia shimadae 
Aristolochia sicula 
Aristolochia silvatica 
Aristolochia sinaloae 
Aristolochia singalangensis 
Aristolochia sinoburmanica 
Aristolochia smilacina 
Aristolochia socorroensis 
Aristolochia sparusifolia 
Aristolochia stahelii 
Aristolochia stenocarpa 
Aristolochia stenosiphon 
Aristolochia steupii 
Aristolochia stevensii 
Aristolochia steyermarkii 
Aristolochia stomachoidis 
Aristolochia stuckertii 
Aristolochia styoglossa 
Aristolochia subglobosa 
Aristolochia surinamensis 
Aristolochia tadungensis 
Aristolochia taliscana 
Aristolochia tamnifolia 
Aristolochia tanzawana 
Aristolochia tapilulensis 
Aristolochia tentaculata 
Aristolochia tequilana 
Aristolochia teretiflora 
Aristolochia thibetica 
Aristolochia thozetii 
Aristolochia thwaitesii 
Aristolochia tigrina 
Aristolochia tithonusiana 
Aristolochia tomentosa 
Aristolochia tonduzii 
Aristolochia tongbiguanensis 
Aristolochia tonkinensis 
Aristolochia transsecta 
Aristolochia transtillifera 
Aristolochia tresmariae 
Aristolochia triactina 
Aristolochia trianae 
Aristolochia triangularis 
Aristolochia tricaudata 
Aristolochia trichostoma 
Aristolochia trilobata 
Aristolochia trulliformis 
Aristolochia truncata 
Aristolochia tuberosa 
Aristolochia tubiflora 
Aristolochia tuitensis 
Aristolochia tyrrhena 
Aristolochia urbaniana 
Aristolochia urupaensis 
Aristolochia utriformis 
Aristolochia vallisicola 
Aristolochia variifolia 
Aristolochia veracruzana 
Aristolochia versabilifolia 
Aristolochia versicolor 
Aristolochia viperina 
Aristolochia vitiensis 
Aristolochia wardiana 
Aristolochia warmingii 
Aristolochia watsonii 
Aristolochia weberbaueri 
Aristolochia weddellii 
Aristolochia weixiensis 
Aristolochia wendeliana 
Aristolochia wenshanensis 
Aristolochia werdermanniana 
Aristolochia westlandii 
Aristolochia whitei 
Aristolochia williamsii 
Aristolochia wrightii 
Aristolochia wuana 
Aristolochia xerophytica 
Aristolochia xuanlienensis 
Aristolochia yachangensis 
Aristolochia yalaensis 
Aristolochia yangii 
Aristolochia yujungiana 
Aristolochia yungasensis 
Aristolochia yunnanensis 
Aristolochia zebrina 
Aristolochia zenkeri 
Aristolochia zhongdianensis 
Aristolochia zollingeriana

References

Aristolochia